The 1876 East Suffolk by-election was fought on 22 February 1876.  The byelection was fought due to the succession to a peerage of the incumbent Conservative MP, Viscount Mahon.  It was won by the Conservative candidate Frederick St John Barne.

References

1876 elections in the United Kingdom
1876 in England
East